Fred Bridgland is a British writer and biographer. During the Angolan Civil War, he wrote about South Africa's involvement in Angola and in the 1990s he revealed human rights abuses committed by UNITA rebels under the command of Jonas Savimbi. Critics have derided his biography of Savimbi, Jonas Savimbi: A Key to Africa, as the work of an apologist. Bridgland has denied this claim in interviews, saying rather he was just a biographer.

Bridgland has also written 3 books, including: The War for Africa: Twelve Months That Transformed a Continent, Jonas Savimbi: A Key to Africa, and Katiza's Journey

References

Year of birth missing (living people)
Living people
Angolan Civil War
People of the South African Border War
People of the Angolan Civil War
British expatriates in South Africa
British war correspondents
British writers
Prisoners and detainees of Syria